Olev may refer to:
 EML Olev (M415), Estonian minelayer
 Office of Low Emission Vehicles (OLEV), part of the UK government Department for Transport
 Online Electric Vehicle (OLEV)

People

Given name 
 Olev Eskola (1914–1990), Estonian actor
 Olev Olesk (1921–2017), Estonian politician
 Olev Raju (born 1948), Estonian economist and politician
 Olev Roomet (1901–1987), Estonian musician
 Olev Siinmaa (1881–1948), Estonian architect
 Olev Subbi (1930–2013), Estonian artist
 Olev Tinn (1920–1971), Estonian actor
 Olev Toomet (1929–2009), Estonian politician
 Olev Vinn (born 1971), Estonian paleobiologist and paleontologist

Surname 
 Naum Olev (1939–2009), Russian lyricist

Estonian masculine given names